= Towage =

Towage may refer to:

- Towing, or a charge or fee associated with it
- Tugboat, a boat that maneuvers larger boats
